Mosonmagyaróvár is a district in northern part of Győr-Moson-Sopron County. Mosonmagyaróvár is also the name of the town where the district seat is found. The district is located in the Western Transdanubia Statistical Region.

Geography 
Mosonmagyaróvár District borders with the Slovakian regions of Bratislava and Trnava to the northeast, Győr District and Csorna District to the south, Kapuvár District and Austrian state of Burgenland to the west. The number of the inhabited places in Mosonmagyaróvár District is 26.

Municipalities 
The district has 3 towns, 1 large village and 22 villages.
(ordered by population, as of 1 January 2012)

The bolded municipalities are cities, italics municipality is large village.

Demographics

In 2011, it had a population of 72,609 and the population density was 81/km².

Ethnicity
Besides the Hungarian majority, the main minorities are the German (approx. 3,000), Slovak (1,300), Croat (1,000), Roma (300) and Romanian (200).

Total population (2011 census): 72,609
Ethnic groups (2011 census): Identified themselves: 67,682 persons:
Hungarians: 61,125 (90.31%)
Germans: 3,077 (4.55%)
Slovaks: 1,363 (2.01%)
Croats: 1,009 (1.49%)
Others and indefinable: 1,108 (1.64%)
Approx. 5,000 persons in Mosonmagyaróvár District did not declare their ethnic group at the 2011 census.

Religion
Religious adherence in the county according to 2011 census:

Catholic – 39,885 (Roman Catholic – 39,705; Greek Catholic – 163);
Reformed – 2,018;
Evangelical – 1,653;
other religions – 511; 
Non-religious – 8,084; 
Atheism – 804;
Undeclared – 19,654.

See also
List of cities and towns in Hungary

References

External links
 Postal codes of the Mosonmagyaróvár District

Districts in Győr-Moson-Sopron County